William Henry Lacy (Pinyin: Lì Wéilián; Foochow Romanized: Lĭk Ùi-lièng; January 8, 1858 - September 3, 1925) was an American Methodist missionary to China.

Life

William Henry Lacy was born on January 8, 1858, in Milwaukee, Wisconsin. He graduated from Northwestern University and the Garrett Bible Institute, and was ordained in 1883. In 1887, he was sent to Foochow as a missionary under the Board of Foreign Missions of the Methodist Episcopal Church. He and his wife Emma Nind Lacy, daughter of Mary Clarke Nind, arrived in Foochow on November 5, 1887. Rev. Lacy consequently served as a professor at the Foochow Anglo-Chinese College from 1887 to 1894, superintendent of the Anglo-Chinese Book Concern in Foochow from 1891 to 1902, senior manager from 1902 to 1906, and manager of the Methodist Publishing House in China in Foochow and Shanghai after 1907.

On September 3, 1925, Lacy died in Shanghai. His four sons, Walter Nind, Henry Veere, George Carleton and William Irving Lacy, and one daughter, Alice Maie Lacy (1893-1921), were also missionaries to China.

References

American Methodist missionaries
Methodist missionaries in China
Christian missionaries in Fujian
Northwestern University alumni
Religious leaders from Milwaukee
1858 births
1925 deaths
American expatriates in China